Namibian – Zimbabwean relations refer to the bilateral relationship between the Republic of Namibia and the Republic of Zimbabwe.

Zanu-PF-SWAPO relations
The ruling parties of Namibia (since independence in 1990) and Zimbabwe (since independence in 1980) have been close since pre-independence days, as both were anti-colonial movements against white-minority governments.

Military
Namibia sent troops in the Namibia Defence Force to the Democratic Republic of the Congo alongside Zimbabwe in a SADC coalition to support the government of President Laurent Kabila in the late 1990s and early 2000s.

References

External links
 Namibia and Zimbabwe - the second liberation by Henning Melber, pambazuka.org, 13 May 2008

 
Zim
Bilateral relations of Zimbabwe
Namibia and the Commonwealth of Nations
Zimbabwe and the Commonwealth of Nations